The Eyes Leave a Trace (Spanish: Los ojos dejan huellas) is a 1952 Spanish-Italian thriller film directed by José Luis Sáenz de Heredia. It stars Italian actor Raf Vallone and his wife Elena Varzi. It was co-produced in Italy, where it is known as Uomini senza pace ("Men without peace").

It was shot at the Cinecittà Studios in Rome and on location in Madrid. The film's sets were designed by the art director Ramiro Gómez.

Synopsis 
Martin, a former lawyer dismissed from the bar and converted into a perfume salesman, works with Roberto, a brilliant and intelligent classmate. He falls in love with his partner's wife. One night, Roberto asks Martin for help, because he thinks he killed his wife's lover.

Cast
Raf Vallone	 as 	Martín Jordán
Elena Varzi	as 	Berta 
Julio Peña	as 	Roberto Ayala
Fernando Fernán Gómez	as 	Agente Díaz
Emma Penella	as 	Lola
Félix Dafauce	as 	Comisario Ozalla
 Gaspar Campos as Conserje
 Aníbal Vela  as Comisario principal
 Fernando Sancho as Comensal irascible 
 Carlos Díaz de Mendoza as Prestamista
 Antonio Riquelme as Sereno 
 Beni Deus as Encargado del Café Gijón
 Julia Pachelo as Bibliotecaria
 Juana Mansó as Encargada del teléfono
 Francisco Bernal as Guía de El Escorial

References

Bibliography
 Mira, Alberto. Historical Dictionary of Spanish Cinema. Scarecrow Press, 2010.

External links
 

1952 films
Italian thriller drama films
1950s Spanish-language films
1950s thriller films
Spain in fiction
Madrid in fiction
Spanish black-and-white films
Films directed by José Luis Sáenz de Heredia
Films shot at Cinecittà Studios
Cifesa films
Spanish thriller drama films
1950s Spanish films
1950s Italian films